Green stuff can refer to:

 money (slang)
 A type of epoxy putty, sometimes sold under the brand name Kneadatite, used by modelers and sculptors
 A mint and coriander seasoning, often used as a raita
 A dish also known as Watergate salad